This is a list of the weekly Canadian RPM magazine number one Top Singles chart of 1972.

See also
1972 in music

List of Billboard Hot 100 number ones of 1972
List of Cashbox Top 100 number-one singles of 1972

References
Notes

External links
 Read about RPM Magazine at the AV Trust
 Search RPM charts here at Library and Archives Canada

 
1972 record charts
1972